Championship Manager is a series of football-management simulation video games, the first of which was released in 1992.

The Championship Manager brand and game was conceived by brothers Paul and Oliver Collyer. In a scenario typical of many self-made game programming teams in the early days of the industry, the original Championship Manager game was written from their bedroom in Shropshire, England. The brothers subsequently founded a development company to take the game further, Sports Interactive, and moved to Islington, North London.  Championship Manager became the most popular football management sim of the later 1990s and early 2000s, regularly setting sales records.

In 2003, Sports Interactive split with Eidos, the publishers of Championship Manager. Sports Interactive retained the game's database and match engine, producing a new game based on these titled Football Manager. Eidos retained the name and interface, with BGS taking over the development of Championship Manager. Although the two series initially ran alongside one another, the sales of Championship Manager began to fall below those of Football Manager. The most recent full version of Championship Manager was Championship Manager 2010, with an iOS mobile game in 2011 the latest game to date released by Eidos.

Square Enix Europe, owners of the brand after purchasing Eidos, revived Championship Manager under the title of Champ Man in 2013. They have released five games for iOS and Android handheld systems and mobile phones since then.

Championship Manager

The release of the first version of the game was not an outstanding success, and sales were steady rather than spectacular. Reviews ranged from the encouraging to the dismissive; the original game was written in BASIC, a programming language not well suited to programming high-performance video games. Other limitations included the fact that generated names were used for each team, whereas its key competitors of the time, such as Premier Manager and The Manager, included real players in the game.

Championship Manager '93

The release of Championship Manager '93 one year later built on the original game, ported to the C programming language, adding a real life player database and other features. By now Championship Manager had built a large following in the UK. This was reviewed many times around July 1993 from its release in around May 1993.

Championship Manager Italia

The Championship Manager '93/94 engine was the basis for Championship Manager Italia. This was a version that simulated the top two divisions of Italian football (Serie A and Serie B). There was also a 1995 seasonal update released for this game.

Championship Manager '93 data update disks
The success of Championship Manager '93 spurred the release of two update disks, the first "contains every transfer, promotion, relegation and manager changes" for the beginning of the '93/'94 season which is known as "The 1993/94 Season Data Up-Date Disk". The update required the original Championship Manager '93 disks, three blank disks and the Championship Manager '93/'94 Season Data Up-Date Disk disk.  This was released around September 1993.

The second of the two update disks is known as "End of 1994 Season Data Up-Date Disk." which "Includes all the latest player transfers. All the play-off results. End of season player stats" for the season 1993/1994. This was released around the end of season 1993/1994.

Championship Manager 2

The success of the franchise lead to the release of Championship Manager 2 in September 1995. The game again included up-to-date squads for each team, added photos of each ground to build an atmosphere of the teams managed or visited, and included an in-match commentary with the voice of Clive Tyldesley.

Two seasonal updates followed over the next two years.

Championship Manager 96/97

Championship Manager 96/97 was released in 1996 and was the first game to feature a non-British league as playable in the standard game - in this case the Italian leagues. It also included several rule changes to reflect the many changes going on in the real life world of football at that time, such as the Bosman ruling.

Championship Manager 97/98

Released in 1997, this version of the game included nine leagues from around the world, three of which could be run simultaneously, new competition formats to follow those implemented in reality, and many more tactical options. The game remains popular amongst fans of the series, mainly for its simplicity compared to the huge, processor-intensive games that the series has since developed into.

Championship Manager 3

This was the first of the seasonal updates to Championship Manager 3. It also included more media involvement, board interaction and improved scouting functions.

Championship Manager: Season 99/00

This update saw the American Major League Soccer added to the list of playable leagues. It also added the World Club Championship to the equation.

Championship Manager: Season 99/00 received a "Gold" sales award from the Entertainment and Leisure Software Publishers Association (ELSPA), indicating sales of at least 200,000 copies in the United Kingdom.

Championship Manager: Season 00/01

Ten more playable leagues were introduced for this version, including Australia, Greece, Northern Ireland, Russia and Wales. It was also the first version of the game to come with a data editor - something which has been continued for all subsequent versions.

Championship Manager: Season 01/02

No new playable leagues were added to this version of Championship Manager (until a patch was later released that added South Korea's K-League to the game) allowing the developers to fine-tune the game's mechanics. Championship Manager 01/02 also contained the fictional players. The game was released as freeware in December 2008.

In April 2002, Sports Interactive took the decision to move away from the PC platform for the first time since Championship Manager 2, producing a version of Championship Manager 01/02 for the Xbox. The success of the game saw a follow up, Championship Manager 02/03 released seven months later.

Championship Manager 4

Championship Manager 4 was released on March 28, 2003, and broke all records on its release becoming, at that time, the fastest-selling PC game on its first day of release. Championship Manager 4 included thirty-nine playable leagues, plus four more in its update, Championship Manager: Season 03/04. On the gameplay side, a top-down view of the match engine was included for the first time a significant shift from the "imagination" philosophy championed by Sports Interactive previously.

Despite its high sales, Championship Manager 4 was generally not well received by hardcore fans for several reasons. The game ran quite slowly on computers which had previously had no difficulty in running Championship Manager games. The original release contained some functional bugs which in some cases rendered the game farcical—the score in matches could randomly change, and lower division clubs were able to sign superstars with ease. One bug had non-league club Northwich Victoria moving to a stadium with a capacity of 850,000. Sports Interactive used the euphemistic term "Enhancement Packs" to describe patches to fix the bugs in the original release; this term was dropped for future releases.

Championship Manager: Season 03/04

This was the final Championship Manager game to be developed by Sports Interactive before they were forced to start a new franchise under the name Football Manager. Championship Manager 03/04 ironed out many of the problems seen in Championship Manager 4 and added new features and more new playable leagues to the game.

Championship Manager 5

This was the first version in the series to be developed in-house by Eidos. Both Football Manager 2005 and Championship Manager 5 were to be released in  October or November 2004. However, the release date of Championship Manager 5 was put back by Eidos to March 2005, due to the extent of work required to code the game from scratch. This allowed Football Manager 2005 a clear run to establish itself ahead of the release of Championship Manager 5.

Championship Manager PSP
Championship Manager was released for the PlayStation Portable in December 2005. It was developed by Gusto Games and was the first game in the series to be released on a handheld system.

Championship Manager Online

This is the first online version of either Championship Manager or Football Manager, and was launched in UK on February 22, 2005.

Championship Manager 2006

The follow-up to Championship Manager 5 was released on PC on March 31, 2006 under the name Championship Manager 2006.

This version did little to reverse the growing gap in quality between Championship Manager and Football Manager. Basic features that had been a staple of the latter from over a decade, such as international management, were missing from the boxed version of Championship Manager 2006.

November 10, 2006, saw the arrival of Championship Manager 2006 (with Championship Manager 5 not being ported) on Macintosh. Championship Manager 2007 was planned for release on the Mac OS X platform in 2007.

Championship Manager 2007

Championship Manager 2007 was released on October 13, 2006. Sales continued to be lower than for Football Manager.

Championship Manager 2008

Championship Manager 2008 was released on 2 November 2008, with users able to play in a multiplayer mode, with more than one person on an account. Also, users can manage nations and can apply "Club Benefactor", which lets the user have more money, although these additions were added in the previous Championship Manager. Another feature is the addition of more leagues – for example, the Australian League – player tendencies and team talks.

Championship Manager 2010

Championship Manager 2010 was originally planned for release on 24 April 2009, however Eidos Interactive released the game on September 11, 2009. A fully 3D match engine (using motion-captured movements to provide more than 500 animations per player) was implemented for the first time, and it was announced on February 6 that new English Leagues, the Isthmian, Southern and Northern Premier Leagues would be included in the game, as well as Croatian, Romanian, Irish and Northern Irish Leagues. The German league system was also restructured for this edition, including the 3. Liga and 3 Regionalliga. The game was released 11 September with a demo version being available on the website from 14 August.

On 18 August a "pay what you want for Championship Manager 2010" promotion was announced whereby between 18 August and 10 September a digital copy of the game could be pre-ordered from the Championship Manager store and was available for download on the day of launch, 10 September. Each customer set the price they were willing to pay in addition to a transaction fee.

Championship Manager 2011

A version of Championship Manager 2011 was released for iOS. No later version had been released . It was followed by a period of three years with no Championship Manager games, although a new game, Championship Manager: World of Football (a collaboration between Beautiful Game Studios and Shanda Games), was announced by Square Enix in July 2011.

Champ Man
The series was revived as Champ Man from 2013 until 2018, developed by Distinctive Developments. Championship Manager 13/14, branded as Champ Man, was released on October 15, 2013 for mobile phones. A follow up to this game, Champ Man 15, was released on August 18, 2014, for iOS and Android, Champ Man 16 was released in September 2015. In 2016, Championship Manager 17 was released. As of May 31, 2018, Square Enix has ceased all game services for all Championship Manager mobile games and removed them from the iOS and Android app stores.

References

External links
Square Enix' official Championship Manager website
Championship Manager series on MobyGames

Eidos Interactive games
Square Enix franchises
Multiplayer hotseat games
Video game franchises
Video game franchises introduced in 1992
Association football management video games
Video games developed in the United Kingdom